Chris Shiflett & the Dead Peasants is the self-titled debut album from Chris Shiflett, lead guitarist of Foo Fighters. The Dead Peasants are his second side project, following Jackson United, and the backing band is composed of different musicians than that of Jackson United.

The album is a departure from his rock/punk background, and is influenced by country, rockabilly, and Americana.

All songs feature Shiflett as lead vocalist and guitarist. All songs are also written by him, with the exception of "Burning Lights", a cover of a song performed by Joe Strummer in a cameo in the 1990 film, I Hired a Contract Killer.

Track listing
Helsinki
Get Along
Bandaged
God Damn
Burning Lights 
An Atheists Prayer
Not Going Down Alone
Baby, Let It Out
Death March

Personnel
Chris Shiflett – lead vocals, lead guitar; mandolin on "God Damn", bass guitar on "Not Going Down Alone" and "Death March"
Paul Bushnell – bass guitar
Stevie Blacke – violin and mandolin
Davey Faragher – bass
Dan Lavery – backing vocals
Greg Leisz – pedal steel guitar
John Lousteau – drums
Audra Mae – backing vocals
Eddie Perez – rhythm guitar
Derek Silverman – keyboards
Heather Waters – backing vocals

References

Chris Shiflett interview with Ultimate Guitar

2010 debut albums
Chris Shiflett albums